Ronald René Charles Paul  (20 January 1921 – 16 June 2008) was a British fencer.

Fencing career
He competed at four Olympic Games and won ten Commonwealth Games medals.

He represented England and won two gold medals in the foil individual and team and a silver medal in the Épée team at the 1950 British Empire Games in Auckland, New Zealand.

Four years later he won four medals at the 1954 British Empire and Commonwealth Games in Vancouver, British Columbia, Canada; three golds in the Épée team and Foil individual and team and a silver in the Épée individual. Two more medals were won during the 1958 British Empire and Commonwealth Games in Cardiff, Wales and his tenth and final medal was won at the 1962 British Empire and Commonwealth Games in Perth, Western Australia.

Paul was a five times British fencing champion, winning five foil titles at the British Fencing Championships, from 1947 to 1962.

Personal life
He is part of a famous fencing and athletics family; wife Doreen, sons Graham Paul and Barry Paul, brother Raymond Paul and nephew Steven Paul.

References

1921 births
2008 deaths
British male fencers
Olympic fencers of Great Britain
Fencers at the 1948 Summer Olympics
Fencers at the 1952 Summer Olympics
Fencers at the 1956 Summer Olympics
Fencers at the 1960 Summer Olympics
People from Paddington
Fencers at the 1950 British Empire Games
Fencers at the 1954 British Empire and Commonwealth Games
Fencers at the 1958 British Empire and Commonwealth Games
Fencers at the 1962 British Empire and Commonwealth Games
Commonwealth Games medallists in fencing
Commonwealth Games gold medallists for England
Commonwealth Games silver medallists for England
Commonwealth Games bronze medallists for England
Medallists at the 1950 British Empire Games
Medallists at the 1954 British Empire and Commonwealth Games
Medallists at the 1958 British Empire and Commonwealth Games
Medallists at the 1962 British Empire and Commonwealth Games